Cornelia Metella ( 73 BC – after 48 BC) was the daughter of Quintus Caecilius Metellus Pius Scipio Nasica (who was a consul in 52 BC and originally from the gens Cornelia). She appears in numerous literary sources, including an official dedicatory inscription at Pergamon.

Biography
Plutarch describes her as a beautiful woman of good character, well read and a skilled player of the lyre. She was also very well educated in geometry and philosophy. 

Cornelia was first married to Publius Licinius Crassus, son of Marcus Licinius Crassus, in 55 or 54 BC, when he returned to Rome after serving under Julius Caesar in Gaul. After her first husband's death at the Battle of Carrhae, Cornelia became the fifth wife of Pompey in 52 BC. She was a faithful follower of Pompey and met him in Mytilene with his son Sextus Pompeius, after the Battle of Pharsalus in 48 BC. Together, they fled to Egypt where Pompey was murdered. On his arrival, Caesar punished the murderers of Pompey and gave Cornelia his ashes and signet ring. She returned to Rome and spent the rest of her life in Pompey's estates in Italy.

Cultural references

Cornelia appears in George Frideric Handel's 1724 opera Giulio Cesare in Egitto ("Julius Caesar in Egypt"), where she pleads with Caesar to spare her husband; he is about to grant her plea, but Pompey was already killed by the Egyptians. She is the title and main character in Robert Garnier's play Cornélie and its English language adaptation Cornelia by Thomas Kyd.

In the first season of the TV series Rome, broadcast in 2005, Cornelia is portrayed by actress Anna Patrick. Unlike the historic Cornelia, this portrayal sees her as middle aged, and as having two children probably from her first marriage, not with Pompey.

See also
 Women in ancient Rome

References

70s BC births
1st-century BC Roman women
1st-century BC Romans
Cornelii Scipiones
Wives of Pompey